{{Infobox former country
|native_name            = 
|conventional_long_name = United Principalities of Moldavia and Wallachia (1859–1862)Romanian United Principalities (1862–1866)Romania (1866–1881)                     
|common_name            = United Principalities
|status                 = Vassal
|empire                 = Ottoman Empire
|status_text            = De jure vassal of the Ottoman Empire (1859–1877)
|era                    = 
|year_start             = 1859
|year_end               = 1881
|date_start             = 24 January
|event_start            = Union between Moldavia and Wallachia
|event1                 = First common government
|date_event1            = 22 January 1862
|event2                 = First Constitution
|date_event2            = 13 July 1866
|event3                 = Independence from the Ottoman Empire
|date_event3            = 9 May 1877
|date_end               = 14 March
|event_end              = Kingdom established
|p1                     = Principality of Moldavia
|flag_p1                = Flag of Moldavia in 1831.svg
|p2                     = Principality of Wallachia
|flag_p2                = Flag of Wallachia 1858.svg
|p3                     = Northern Dobruja
|flag_p3                = Flag of the Ottoman Empire.svg
|s1                     = Kingdom of Romania
|flag_s1                = Flag of Romania.svg
|s2                     = Bessarabia Governorate
|flag_s2                = Flag of the Russian Empire (black-yellow-white).svg
|image_flag             = Flag of the United Principalities of Wallachia and Moldavia (1859 - 1862).svg 
|alt_flag               = Flag used 1862-1866
|alt_flag2              = Flag used 1866-1881 
|flag                   = Flag of Romania
|flag_type              = Flag
|image_coat             = Principality of Romania - 1872 CoA.svg
|coa_size               = 100
|image_map              = Romania 1859-1878.png
|image_map_caption      = The United Principalities (Romania) 1859–1878, shown in light beige
|national_motto         = 
|national_anthem        = {{ubl|"Hora Unirii'"|"Hora of the Union"|(popular, unofficial)}}
|common_languages       = 
|religion = Romanian Orthodox, Catholicism, Judaism, Reformed Church
|capital                = 
|government_type        = 
|leader1                = Alexandru Ioan Cuza
|leader2                = Carol I
|year_leader1           = 1859–1866
|year_leader2           = 1866–1881
|title_leader           = Domnitor (Prince)
|representative1        = Lascăr Catargiu
|representative2        = Nicolae Golescu
|representative3        = Nicolae Haralambie
|year_representative1   = 1866
|year_representative2   = 1866
|year_representative3   = 1866
|title_representative   = Regency
|deputy1                = Barbu Catargiu (first)
|deputy2                = Ion Brătianu (last)
|year_deputy1           = 1862
|year_deputy2           = 1879–1881
|title_deputy           = President of the Council of Ministers
|legislature            = Parliament
|house1                 = Senate
|house2                 = Assembly of Deputies
|stat_year1             = 1860
|stat_area1             = 123,335
|stat_pop1              = 3,917,541
|stat_year2             = 1881
|stat_area2             = 130,177
|stat_pop2              = 4,545,821
|ref_area1              = 
|ref_pop1               = 
|ref_area2              = 
|ref_pop2               = 
|currency               = 
|today                  = 
|footnotes              = 
|demonym=Romanian|area_km2=|area_rank=|GDP_PPP=|GDP_PPP_year=|HDI=|HDI_year=|alt_coat=Coat of arms 1872-1881}}

The United Principalities of Moldavia and Wallachia, commonly called United Principalities, was the personal union of the Principality of Moldavia and the Principality of Wallachia, formed on  when Alexandru Ioan Cuza was elected as the Domnitor (Ruling Prince) of both principalities, which were autonomous but still vassals of the Ottoman Empire and which resulted in the unification of both principalities. On , Moldavia and Wallachia formally united to create the Romanian United Principalities, the core of the Romanian nation state.

In February 1866, Prince Cuza was forced to abdicate and go into exile by a political coalition led by the Liberals; the German Prince Karl of Hohenzollern-Sigmaringen was offered the Throne and, on  he entered Bucharest for the first time. In July the same year, a new constitution came into effect, giving the country the name of Romania; internationally, this name was used only after 1877, since at the time the foreign policy of the state was drafted by the Ottomans. Nominally, the new state remained a vassal of the Ottoman Empire. However, by this time the suzerainty of the Sublime Porte had become a legal fiction. Romania had its own flag and anthem; after 1867, it had its own currency as well.

On , Romania proclaimed itself fully independent; the proclamation was sanctioned by the Domnitor the following day. After the First World War, Transylvania and other territories were also included.

For its triple symbolic meaning, the date of May 10 was celebrated as Romania's National Day until 1948, when the Communist regime installed the republic on 30 December 1947.

Background
As a historical term designating the pre-Union Principalities of Moldavia and Wallachia, sometimes including the Principality of Transylvania, the term "Romanian Principalities" dates back to the beginnings of modern Romanian history in the mid-19th century. It was subsequently used by Romanian historians as an alternative to the much older term "Romanian Lands". English use of "Romanian Principalities" is documented from the second half of the 19th century.

In the period between the late 18th century and the 1860s, Danubian Principalities was used, a term that sometimes included Serbia, but not Transylvania. In contrast, use of "Romanian Principalities" sometimes included Transylvania but never Serbia.

History

The aftermath of the Russian Empire's defeat in the Crimean War brought the 1856 Treaty of Paris, which started a period of common tutelage for the Ottomans and a Congress of Great Powers—the United Kingdom of Great Britain and Ireland, the Second French Empire, the Kingdom of Piedmont-Sardinia, the Austrian Empire, Prussia, and, though never again fully, Russia. While the Moldavia-Wallachia unionist campaign, which had come to dominate political demands, was accepted with sympathy by the French, Russians, Prussians, and Sardinians, it was rejected by the Austrian Empire, and looked upon with suspicion by Great Britain and the Ottomans. Negotiations amounted to an agreement on a minimal formal union; however, elections for the ad-hoc divans in 1859 profited from an ambiguity in the text of the final agreement, which, while specifying two thrones, did not prevent the same person from occupying both thrones simultaneously and ultimately ushered in the ruling of Alexandru Ioan Cuza as Domnitor (Ruling Prince) over the United Romanian Principalities from 1862 onwards, uniting both principalities.

Though internationally formally recognized only after the period of Cuza's reign, the Union was cemented by Ioan Cuza's unsanctioned interventions in the text of previous "Organic Law". In addition, the circumstances of his deposition in 1866, together with the rapid election of Prussian Prince Carol of Hohenzollern-Sigmaringen (who was backed by the increasingly important Prussia) and the Austro-Prussian War in the same time, made applying measures against the Union actually impossible.

Following the Romanian War of Independence in 1877–78, Romania shook off formal Ottoman rule but eventually clashed with its Russian ally over its demand for the Southern Bessarabia region. Ultimately, Romania was awarded Northern Dobruja in exchange for Southern Bessarabia. The Kingdom of Romania subsequently emerged in 1881 with Prince Carol being crowned as King Carol I of Romania.

The reign of Alexandru Ioan Cuza

Alexandru Ioan Cuza took steps to unify the administrations of the two Romanian Principalities and gain international recognition for the Union. He also adopted several reforms, including the secularization of church lands, introduction of free primary education, a French-inspired civil code and penal code as well as a limited agrarian reform and one in the army.

Opposition from the large-land-owners dominated parliament to Cuza resulted in a coup against him in 1864. He subsequently instituted authoritarian rule but his popular support, strong at the time of the coup, gradually waned as the land reform failed to bring prosperity to the peasant majority.

Cuza was forced to abdicate in 1866 by the two main political groups, the Conservatives and the Liberals, who represented the interests of former large-land-owners. Although the event sparked some anti-unionist turmoil in Cuza's native province of Moldavia, it was quickly suppressed by the central authorities.

The reign of Carol I as Prince

The new governing coalition appointed Carol of Hohenzollern-Sigmaringen as the new Ruling Prince of Romania in a move initially rejected by the European powers but later on accepted. In the first year of Carol's reign Romania adopted its first constitution. This instrument provided for a hereditary constitutional monarchy, with a Parliament being elected through censitary suffrage although the country remained under Ottoman suzerainty. Carol was not unanimously accepted, and a rise in republican sentiment culminated with an uprising in Ploiești in 1870 and a revolt in Bucharest in 1871, both of which were quelled by the army.

In April 1877, in the wake of a new Russo-Turkish war, Romania signed a convention by which Russian troops were allowed to pass through Romanian territory in their advance towards the Ottoman Empire. On May 9, the Romanian parliament declared the independence of the principality, and joined the war on the Russian side. After several Romanian victories south of the Danube and the ultimate victory of the Russian-led side in the war, the European powers recognized Romania's independence under the 1878 Treaty of Berlin. Nevertheless, Romania was made to exchange Southern Bessarabia for Northern Dobruja, and allow non-Christians living in Romania access to Romanian citizenship.

In 1881, the country's parliament proclaimed Romania a kingdom.

List of Princes of Romania

Administrative division

As of 1872, the Romanian Principality was organized into 33 counties of which 17 were in Wallachia (12 in Muntenia and 5 in Oltenia), and 16 were in Moldavia (13 in western Moldavia and 3 in southern Bessarabia).

Demographics

According to the 1859–1860 census, the United Principalities had a population of 3,864,848.

Cities with more than 10,000 inhabitants, in 1859:

Notes: 1 - data for 1856.

See also

 Danubian Principalities
 Romanian Old Kingdom

References

Further reading
 Keith Hitchins, The Romanians, 1774–1866'' (1996) online
 Europa, Rusia si Romania, Ethnic and Political Studies, D. A. Sturdza, 1890 

 
1859 establishments in Europe
1881 disestablishments in Europe
History of Eastern Romance people
History of Moldavia (1822–1859)
History of Wallachia (1821–1859)
Kingdom of Romania
Vassal states of the Ottoman Empire
Former principalities